Isopregnanolone, also known as isoallopregnanolone and epiallopregnanolone, as well as sepranolone, and as 3β-hydroxy-5α-pregnan-20-one or 3β,5α-tetrahydroprogesterone (3β,5α-THP), is an endogenous neurosteroid and a natural 3β-epimer of allopregnanolone. It has been reported to act as a subunit-selective negative allosteric modulator of the GABAA receptor, and antagonizes in animals and humans some but not all of the GABAA receptor-mediated effects of allopregnanolone, such as anesthesia, sedation, and reduced saccadic eye movements, but not learning impairment. Isopregnanolone has no hormonal effects and appears to have no effect on the GABAA receptor by itself; it selectively antagonizes allopregnanolone and does not affect the effects of other types of GABAA receptor positive allosteric modulators such as benzodiazepines or barbiturates.

Isopregnanolone is synthesized from progesterone in the body by the actions of the enzymes 5α-reductase and 3β-hydroxysteroid dehydrogenase (with 5α-dihydroprogesterone as the intermediate in this two-step transformation) and can be reversibly metabolized into allopregnanolone by the enzyme 3α-hydroxysteroid dehydrogenase. Levels of isopregnanolone, progesterone, and allopregnanolone are highly correlated across the menstrual cycle and throughout pregnancy. The concentrations of isopregnanolone are significantly less than those of progesterone and allopregnanolone; about half of those of allopregnanolone, to be precise. Isopregnanolone has a relatively long serum elimination half-life of 14 hours in humans.

Isopregnanolone (developmental code name UC-1010) is under development for the treatment of premenstrual dysphoric disorder. As of 2017, it is in phase II clinical trials for this indication.

Chemistry

See also
 Epipregnanolone
 3β-Dihydroprogesterone
 Pregnanolone
 3β-Androstanediol

References

External links
 Sepranolone - AdisInsight
 Sepranolone - Asarina Pharma

GABAA receptor negative allosteric modulators
Neurosteroids
Pregnanes